Lanisha Diane Cole (or LaNisha Cole) is an American model who has been most recognizable for her eight seasons (2003–2010) as a rotating model on the daily game show The Price Is Right in both the Bob Barker and Drew Carey eras. She has also appeared as the face of Milani/Jordana Cosmetics for 9+ years and had a role in the movies Soul Plane and A Beautiful Soul. After her stint on The Price Is Right as a model, Cole joined the cast of the television series Fact or Faked: Paranormal Files.
Cole opened her art gallery in Santa Monica at Bergamot Station in January 2011 and photography studio Studio 401 LA in Downtown Los Angeles' art district in 2013 where she is owner-photographer.

Early life and education
Cole is a Los Angeles native.

Career
Cole was a model on the NBC primetime game show Deal or No Deal, holding case #15. She left during its second season but returned during the third season as a substitute at cases #2, 4, 6, 10, and 16. She  appeared in   music videos, including Jon B's 2001 video for "Don't Talk", The Roots' "Break You Off", Pharrell's "Frontin'", N*E*R*D's "Maybe", Eric Benet's "Never Want to Live Without You" and others.
Cole  appeared in the Cîroc ad campaign for "Step Into The Circle" with Sean Combs and rapper French Montana.

Controversies
In 2011, she filed a lawsuit claiming she was sexually harassed by two producers for The Price is Right game show: Michael G. Richards and Adam Sandler (not the actor and comedian Adam Sandler).

Personal life 
Cole has a daughter with actor Nick Cannon named Onxy Ice Cold Cannon, born in September 2022.

Filmography
The Price Is Right Herself - Model (2003–2010)
Joey  Miss Reno (1 episode, 2004)
Soul Plane (2004) Bartender
Music Video Beauties: Superstars! (2005) (V)  Herself
Watch Over Me (2006) Melanie (66 episode, 2006)
Gameshow Marathon Model (1 episode, 2006)
Deal or No Deal Herself - Briefcase Model (2006–2008) 
Deal or No Deal (2006) (Video Game)  Model
Fact or Faked: Paranormal Files Herself (2011-2014)
A Beautiful Soul (2012) Ariel

Music videos
"My First Love" by Avant (2000)
"Don't Talk" by Jon.B (2001)
"Break You Off" The Roots ft. Musiq Soulchild (2002)
"I Should Be..." by Dru Hill (2002)
"Ching Ching" by Ms.Jade featuring Timbaland & Nelly Furtado (2002) 
Frontin by Pharrell (2003)
 "Maybe", by N*E*R*D (2004) 
"Charlene"  by Anthony Hamilton (2004)
"Rain" Razah (2007)
"Last Time" by Trey Songz (2008)
"Never Want To Live Without You" Eric Benet (2010)

References

External links

Lanisha Cole hip hop modelling 
Lanisha Cole's profile on the official Price Is Right site

1982 births
Living people
Game show models